Delta(3,5)-Delta(2,4)-dienoyl-CoA isomerase, mitochondrial is an enzyme that in humans is encoded by the ECH1 gene.

This gene encodes a member of the hydratase/isomerase superfamily. The gene product shows high sequence similarity to enoyl-CoA hydratases of several species, particularly within a conserved domain characteristic of these proteins. The encoded protein, Δ3,5-Δ2,4-dienoyl-CoA isomerase, contains a C-terminal peroxisomal targeting sequence and localizes to peroxisomes. The rat ortholog, which localizes to the matrix of both the peroxisome and mitochondria, can isomerize 3-trans,5-cis-dienoyl-CoA to 2-trans,4-trans-dienoyl-CoA, indicating that it is a delta3,5-delta2,4-dienoyl-CoA isomerase. This enzyme functions in the auxiliary step of the fatty acid beta-oxidation pathway. Expression of the rat gene is induced by peroxisome proliferators.

References

Further reading

External links